This is a list in alphabetical order of cricketers who have played for Oxford University Cricket Club (OUCC) in top-class matches since the club was first recorded in 1827. OUCC teams have always had important or first-class cricket status. In 1973 the team also played official List A cricket matches.

Some OUCC players have been members of teams representing combinations of British universities or, since 2001, the Oxford University Centre of Cricketing Excellence (OUCCE), later rebranded the Oxford Marylebone Cricket Club University (Oxford MCCU). This team includes students from other universities in the Oxford area and plays some first-class matches. Since the establishment of OUCCE the only first-class matches in which the OUCC team itself has played are the annual Varsity Matches against Cambridge University Cricket Club. The match will lose its first-class status after the 2020 fixture. This list includes only those players who have represented OUCC itself.

The details are the player's usual name followed by the years in which he was active as an OUCC player and then his name as it would appear on modern match scorecards. Note that many players represented other first-class teams besides OUCC. Players are shown to the end of the 2019 season.

A

B

C

D

E

F

G

H

I
 Imran Khan (1973–1975) : Imran Khan
 Francis Inge (1861–1863) : F. G. Inge
 William Inge (1853) : W. Inge
 Will Inge (1930) : W. W. Inge
 Arthur Irvin (1868–1871) : A. J. E. Irvin
 Francis Isherwood (1872) : F. W. R. Isherwood
 Michael Ivey (1949–1951) : A. M. Ivey

J

K

L

M

N

O

P

Q
 Jeremy Quinlan (1985–1986) : J. D. Quinlan
 James Quinton (1895–1896) : J. M. Quinton

R

S

T

U
 Robin Udal (1904–1906) : N. R. Udal
 Amit Upadhyay (2004) : A. M. Upadhyay

V

W

Y
 Richard Yeabsley (1993–1995) : R. S. Yeabsley
 Charles Duke Yonge (1836) : C. D. Yonge
 Gerald Yonge (1844–1850) : G. E. Yonge
 Douglas Young (1938–1939) : D. E. Young
 Charles Younger (1907) : C. F. Younger

References

Players

Oxford University
Cricketers